"For a Better Day" is a song by Swedish EDM producer Avicii featuring uncredited vocals by American singer Alex Ebert, released as a single in 2015. The track appears on his album Stories and on his two-track EP Pure Grinding / For a Better Day. It was written by Tim Bergling (Avicii) and Alex Ebert. A music video was produced for the song, which was filmed in Hungary.

In 2021, to accompany the renaming of the Ericsson Globe to the Avicii Arena, the Royal Stockholm Philharmonic Orchestra released a version of "For a Better Day" with Ella Tiritiello on vocals. Arranged and conducted by Erik Arvinder, an accompanying music video was shot featuring Tiritiello on the roof of the arena.

Music video
The official music video for "For a Better Day" was released on September 3, 2015. Avicii made his directorial debut by co-directing the video alongside filmmaker Levan Tsikurishvili. Filmed in the summer of 2015 in Hungary, the video stars Swedish actor Krister Henriksson, and tackles the issues of child slavery and child sex trafficking.

The music video is split into three time streams, dealing with child sexual slavery. The video begins with a chauffeured car arriving at a secluded rural location. There, a truck containing black-market goods that are being sold to a half-dozen waiting buyers. Inside the car, a man wearing an expensive suit and wristwatch lights a cigar. His face, and the goods in question, are not seen.

A second time stream is in black and white, depicts a boy and a girl being chased through a field of dead sunflowers being chased by someone in tactical gear. They come out of the field near a cliff, and jump into the sea below.

The third time stream follows two individuals in skull-masks on a murder-spree targeting the men who purchased from the truck. They brand some of their victims, while permitting others to kill themselves. In each case, the face of the newly deceased is crossed out on a rogues' gallery containing dozens of mugshots.

The third time stream finishes as the two masked individuals make their way through a raucous political demonstration demanding freedom before a government building. Their target is an apparently a powerful political figure immune to the will of the people. His watch and cigar identify him as the man in the car. The duo break in, strip him, brand him, and hang him from the roof by noose—but not before unmasking to reveal themselves as an adult man and woman, whom he recognizes as two abused children in his past.

The first time stream is then replayed with dialog audio instead of music. The "goods" being sold from the truck were children. A boy and a girl are stuffed into the truck of the political leader's car. (The meaning of the other time streams is then apparent: they had escaped, and returned as adults for revenge.)

In the concluding scene, the branded word is shown to be "pedofilia".

Track listing 
 Digital download – Kshmr remix
 "For a Better Day" (Kshmr remix) – 4:43
 Digital download – remixes
 "For a Better Day" (DubVision remix) – 4:53
 "For a Better Day" (Kshmr remix) – 4:43
 "For a Better Day" (Billon remix) – 6:13

Charts

Weekly charts

Year-end charts

Certifications

References

2015 songs
2015 singles
Avicii songs
Songs written by Avicii
Swedish horror films
Swedish action films